India national hockey team may refer to:

 India men's national field hockey team
 India men's national under-21 field hockey team
 India women's national field hockey team
 India women's national under-21 field hockey team
 India men's national ice hockey team
 India men's national junior ice hockey team
 India men's national under-18 ice hockey team
 India women's national ice hockey team
 India women's national inline hockey team
 India national roller hockey team